is a Japanese footballer who plays for FC Gifu on loan from Thespakusatsu Gunma from 2023.

Career 

Kubota joined J1 League club; Kashima Antlers in 9 September 2015, he debuted in Emperor's Cup (v FC Ryukyu).

On 25 December 2020, Kubota transferred to J2 club, Thespakusatsu Gunma from 2021.

On 17 December 2022, Kubota loan transfer to J3 club, SC Sagamihara for upcoming 2023 season.

Career statistics 

Updated to the end 2022 season.

Club

References

External links 

1997 births
Living people
Association football people from Aichi Prefecture
Japanese footballers
J1 League players
J2 League players
J3 League players
Kashima Antlers players
Fagiano Okayama players
Matsumoto Yamaga FC players
Thespakusatsu Gunma players
FC Gifu players
Association football midfielders